Ngonidzashe Blessing Mahwire (born 31 July 1982) is a Zimbabwean cricketer who plays first-class cricket for Mashonaland and has also made appearances for the Zimbabwean cricket team in both the Test match and One Day International forms of the game. He is a right-handed batsman and medium-pace bowler.

His introduction to the game came as somewhat of a relief not only because he is a competent all-round cricketer, but also because he comes from a province in Zimbabwe called Masvingo, in which few cricketing roots can be found.

His highest score at school was a 154 in Harare. He considers himself to be a "batsman who bowls", and is mainly used as a front-line bowler.

References

1982 births
Bikita District
Living people
Manicaland cricketers
Mashonaland cricketers
Zimbabwe One Day International cricketers
Zimbabwe Test cricketers
Zimbabwean cricketers
Centrals cricketers
CFX Academy cricketers